Hsieh Su-wei was the defending champion, having won the 2012 Ningbo Challenger – Women's singles, but decided not to participate.

Bojana Jovanovski won the title, defeating Zhang Shuai in the final, 6–7(7–9), 6–4, 6–1.

Seeds

Main draw

Finals

Top half

Bottom half

References 
 Main draw
 Qualifying draw

Ningbo International Women's Tennis Open - Singles
Ningbo International Women's Tennis Open